Giuseppe Canale (1725–1802) was an Italian designer and engraver. He was born in Rome, the son of Antonio Canale. He was instructed in engraving by Jacob Frey, and also frequented the school of the Cavalière Marco Benefial. In 1751 he was invited to Dresden to assist in engraving plates for the pictures in their Gallery, and was appointed engraver to the Court. He completed the following prints: 
Portrait of Maria Mattia Perini after Benefial
Portrait of Maria Antonia, Electress Dowager of Saxony after a self-portrait drawing
Portrait of Archbishop Bonaventura Barberini
Portrait of Maria Josephina, Queen of Poland
Portrait of Prince Xavier of Saxony
Sepulchral Monument of Cardinal Spinola
Philosopher; after Jusepe RiberaThe Glory after DomenichinoSibyl after Angelica KauffmanParis & Oenone after Van LooAdam and Eve driven from Paradise after AlbaniChrist & St. John after Adrian Van der WerfChrist appearing to St. Thomas after Mattia Preti finished by Jacque Firmin BeauvarletTurkish Woman and Spring'' after Dietrich.

Sources

1725 births
1802 deaths
Italian engravers